Dancer in the Dark is a 2000 film by Lars von Trier, featuring Björk.

Dancer in the Dark may also refer to:

"Dancer in the Dark" (short story), a 2004 science fiction story by David Gerrold
"Dancer in the Dark", a 2003 song by For My Pain... from the album Fallen
"Dancer in the Dark", a 2005 song by The Rasmus from their album Hide from the Sun

See also
Dancing in the Dark (disambiguation)